The Girl Rush is a 1955 American musical comedy film starring Rosalind Russell, filmed in Technicolor and VistaVision, and released by Paramount Pictures.

Plot
Gambling is second nature to Kim Halliday (Russell), whose father taught her all its ins and outs. Unfortunately, he also left her broke, living in Rhode Island and working as a receptionist in a museum run by her aunt Clara (Lorne).

A stroke of luck comes Kim's way when notified that an uncle in Las Vegas has died and left her a 50% interest in a hotel-casino. She excitedly takes Aunt Clara there, but in reality, the hotel is a ramshackle mess and her partner is heavily in debt.

Kim is deceived into believing that the hotel she owns is actually the thriving Flamingo Hotel, right across the street. So it comes as quite a surprise to its real owner, Victor Monte, when a total stranger begins behaving as if the place is hers.

Taffy Tremaine is performing there, and she's just jealous enough to be concerned that Victor might take a fancy to this new woman rather than to her. Kim eventually learns the truth about the two hotels, but catches a break by being introduced to Elliot Atterbury, a naive rich boy who'd like to own a Vegas hotel.

Together they spruce up Kim's hotel, rename it, hire Taffy to perform and give the Flamingo a run for its money. Taffy happily takes up with Elliot instead, while Victor concedes defeat. Once a gambler who lost everything, as Kim's father did, he tells Kim that he's gone broke again from losses at the tables and from the Flamingo's loss of business, so he's leaving town.

Kim persuades him to stay, wanting them to become partners in more ways than one. Victor agrees, whereupon Kim learns that he and the Flamingo are actually having no money troubles at all, their new partnership being what he'd had in mind all along.

Cast
 Rosalind Russell as Kim Halliday
 Fernando Lamas as Victor Monte
 Eddie Albert as Elliot Atterbury
 Gloria DeHaven as Taffy Tremaine
 Marion Lorne as Aunt Clara

Music
 "An Occasional Man" - sung by Gloria DeHaven
 "If You'll Only Take a Chance" - performed by Rosalind Russell and male trio
 "Birmin'ham" - performed by Rosalind Russell and Eddie Albert
 "Champagne"
 "Homesick Hillbilly" - performed by Rosalind Russell and male chorus
 "At Last We're Alone"
 "Out of Doors"
 "The Girl Rush"

All tunes written by Hugh Martin (music) and Ralph Blane (words)

See also
List of American films of 1955

References

External links

1955 films
1955 musical comedy films
American musical comedy films
Films directed by Robert Pirosh
Paramount Pictures films
1950s English-language films
1950s American films